Johan Valentín Camargo Ramos (born December 13, 1993) is a Panamanian professional baseball infielder in the Kansas City Royals organization. He has played in Major League Baseball (MLB) for the Atlanta Braves and Philadelphia Phillies.

Early life
Johan Camargo was born in Panama City, Panama. His parents named him after the footballer Johan Cruyff. When playing baseball as a child, Camargo naturally batted and threw left-handed. His father taught him to throw with his right hand, and Camargo stopped using his left hand for that skill. He later focused on switch-hitting, and joined his first organized baseball league at the age of 13.

Career

Minor leagues
Camargo signed with the Atlanta Braves for $42,000 as a 16-year old out of Panama in July 2010. After missing the 2011 season, Camargo made his professional debut in 2012 with the DSL Braves. Camargo spent 2013 with Rookie level Danville, and hit .294 in 57 games. Camargo began 2014 at Single-A Rome before earning a late season promotion to High-A Lynchburg. Across both levels in 2014, he hit .266 with 46 RBI in 132 games. Camargo spent 2015 with High-A Carolina, hitting .258 with 32 RBI in 130 games. After earning All-Star honors in the Carolina League, Camargo was awarded with a spot in the Arizona Fall League with Peoria. Almost exclusively a shortstop, Camargo began 2016 playing at second base for Double-A Mississippi to accommodate the likes of Ozzie Albies and Dansby Swanson. When all three were on the team, Camargo played third base, and after Swanson was promoted to the major leagues, he took over at shortstop. At the plate, Camargo hit .267 with a career-high 4 HR, along with 43 RBI in 126 games. The Braves added him to their 40-man roster after the season.

Atlanta Braves
After missing out on the Opening Day roster, Camargo was quickly recalled from Triple-A Gwinnett on April 11, 2017, and made his debut that night. After two short-lived stints in the major leagues, Camargo's playing time increased in the month of June when third baseman Adonis García was placed on the disabled list. Camargo hit his first career home run on July 9, against Washington Nationals pitcher Matt Grace. After Adonis Garcia returned from the disabled list at third base, Camargo lost playing time; however, he quickly gained it back when the Braves benched Dansby Swanson who eventually was demoted to Triple A. Camargo was injured in August, and remained with the Gwinnett Braves until September, resulting in the return of Swanson. 

Camargo became the Braves' starting third baseman in May 2018, and retained the role until the start of the 2019 season, when the team signed Josh Donaldson. Following an injury to starting shortstop Dansby Swanson, Camargo played at that position, struggling defensively and offensively. As a result, Camargo was demoted to the Gwinnett Stripers on August 16. Camargo returned to the major leagues when rosters expanded in September. In a game against the Philadelphia Phillies on September 11, he suffered a hairline fracture in his right shin. The Braves subsequently placed Camargo on the 10-day injured list.

In 2019, he batted .233/.279/.384 with 31 runs, 7 home runs, and 32 RBIs, and had the slowest sprint speed of all major league shortstops, at 25.6 feet/second.

In 2020, he batted .200/.244/.367 with 16 runs, 4 home runs, and 9 RBIs. He played 21 games at second base, and 10 at third base, but did not play at all at shortstop for the first season of his major league career.
After the 2020 season, he played for Águilas Cibaeñas of the Dominican Professional Baseball League(LIDOM). He has also played for Dominican Republic in the 2021 Caribbean Series.

Camargo played the majority of the 2021 season with the Gwinnett Stripers, where he learned to play first base, had 16 hitless at bats with the Braves in the majors, and was named to the Braves' roster for the National League Championship Series, replacing Terrance Gore. Gore returned to the Braves' roster for the World Series, in place of Camargo. The Braves eventually won the 2021 World Series, giving the Braves their first title since 1995. On November 30, 2021, it was announced that the Braves would not tender a contract to Camargo for the 2022 season, making him a free agent.

Philadelphia Phillies
On December 1, 2021, Camargo signed a one-year contract with the Philadelphia Phillies. Camargo appeared in 52 games for Philadelphia in 2022, slashing .237/.297/.316 with 3 home runs and 15 RBI. He was designated for assignment on September 25, 2022.

Kansas City Royals
On January 21, 2023, Camargo signed a minor league contract with the Kansas City Royals organization.

References

External links

1993 births
Living people
Águilas Cibaeñas players
Panamanian expatriate baseball players in the Dominican Republic
Atlanta Braves players
Carolina Mudcats players
Danville Braves players
Dominican Summer League Braves players
Gwinnett Braves players
Gwinnett Stripers players
Lynchburg Hillcats players
Major League Baseball players from Panama
Major League Baseball second basemen
Major League Baseball shortstops
Major League Baseball third basemen
Mississippi Braves players
Panamanian expatriate baseball players in the United States
Peoria Javelinas players
Philadelphia Phillies players
Rome Braves players
Sportspeople from Panama City